Unterweser nuclear power station is an inactive nuclear power plant in Kleinensiel (Stadland municipality), near Nordenham.

When it first went online, it was the largest nuclear reactor in the world.  It had 193 fuel assemblies.

Unterweser was one of the seven reactors shut down on 17 March 2011 (although actual shutdown was several days later, as the nuclear fuel rods take time to cool down) pending the results of a three-month moratorium on nuclear power. On 30 May 2011, the German government announced that Unterweser would not be returning to operation following the moratorium and would be decommissioned.  The final fuel rods were removed in February 2019.

References

Former nuclear power stations in Germany
Economy of Lower Saxony